Paul Hacker may refer to:

Paul Hacker (Indologist) (1913–1979), Indologist from Germany
Paul Hacker (diplomat) (born 1946), American diplomat